The George D. Aiken Wilderness is one of eight wilderness areas in the Green Mountain National Forest in the U.S. state of Vermont. The wilderness area, created by the Vermont Wilderness Act of 1984, is named in honor of George Aiken (1892–1984), former U.S. Senator from Vermont who advocated for the passage of the Eastern Wilderness Areas Act of 1975. Today the George D. Aiken Wilderness consists of  managed by the U.S. Forest Service.

See also

 List of largest wilderness areas in the United States
 List of wilderness areas of the United States
 National Wilderness Preservation System
 Wilderness Act

References

Wilderness areas of Vermont
IUCN Category Ib
Protected areas of Bennington County, Vermont
Green Mountain National Forest
Protected areas established in 1984
1984 establishments in Vermont